Central Batesville Historic District is a national historic district located at Batesville, Ripley County, Indiana.  The district encompasses 44 contributing buildings and 3 contributing structures in the central business district and surrounding residential sections of Batesville.  The district developed between about 1852 and 1960 and includes notable examples of Italianate, Queen Anne, Colonial Revival, Tudor Revival, Classical Revival, and Streamline Moderne style architecture.  Notable buildings include the a gas station (c. 1960), Hillenbrand Buildings (c. 1879–1940), Batesville Bank (c. 1895, 1910, 1922), Gibson Theatre (1921), Sherman House (1852), Batesville Memorial Building (1922-1923), German Methodist Church (1889), Boehringer Hall (1856), St. Mark's Evangelical Lutheran Church (1897-1898), Baas-Nolte Building and House (1880), Batesville Post Office (1936-1937), and Batesville Telephone Building (c. 1955).

It was added to the National Register of Historic Places in 2011.

References

Historic districts on the National Register of Historic Places in Indiana
Colonial Revival architecture in Indiana
Tudor Revival architecture in Indiana
Italianate architecture in Indiana
Queen Anne architecture in Indiana
Neoclassical architecture in Indiana
National Register of Historic Places in Ripley County, Indiana